Sinningia tubiflora, the trumpet-flowered sinningia, is a species of flowering plant in the family Gesneriaceae, native to Argentina, Paraguay and Uruguay in South America.

The reddish stems appear in summer.

This plant is grown as an ornamental, for a sheltered spot (minimum temperature ) in sun or partial shade. It prefers a neutral or acid soil.

Synonyms
Plants of the World Online  lists six synonyms:

Achimenes tubiflora 
Dolichodeira tubiflora 
Gesneria tubiflora 
Gesneria tubiflora 
Gloxinia tubiflora 
Houttea tubiflora

References

Flora of Argentina
Flora of Uruguay
Flora of Paraguay
tubiflora